Greensboro is a city in Hale County, Alabama, United States. At the 2010 census the population was 2,497, down from 2,731 at the 2000 census. The city is the county seat of Hale County, Alabama, which was not organized until 1867. It is part of the Tuscaloosa, Alabama Metropolitan Statistical Area.

History
Greensboro was incorporated as a town in December 1823 as "Greensborough". It was named in honor of American Revolutionary War general Nathanael Greene. The name was soon simplified to "Greensboro". The community was known as "Troy" prior to incorporation.

Reflecting the history of the antebellum years and a culture built on cotton plantations to produce the commodity crop, several sites on the National Register of Historic Places in or near Greensboro are connected to this past. These include Glencairn, the Greensboro Historic District, Magnolia Grove, the McGehee-Stringfellow House, Millwood, and the Payne House.

One hundred years later, African Americans in Greensboro were among those in the state continuing to work to regain their civil rights after years of second-class status under Jim Crow. Rev. Martin Luther King Jr., leader of the Southern Christian Leadership Conference, came here in the course of his civil rights projects in the state. In 1968, he hid from Ku Klux Klan members in what is now operated as the Safe House Black Historic Museum.

The southern part of the city was heavily damaged by a low-end EF2 tornado on January 12, 2023.

Geography
Greensboro is slightly southeast of the center of Hale County and is crossed by Alabama State Routes 14, 25, and 69. SR 14 leads northwest  to Eutaw and east  to Marion. SR 25 leads northeast through Talladega National Forest  to Brent and south  to Thomaston. SR 69 leads north  to Tuscaloosa and southwest  to Linden.

Climate
The climate in this area is characterized by hot, humid summers and generally mild to cool winters.  According to the Köppen Climate Classification system, Greensboro has a humid subtropical climate, abbreviated "Cfa" on climate maps.

Demographics

2000 census
As of the census of 2000, there were 2,731 people, 1,026 households, and 688 families living in the city. The racial makeup of the city was 38.30% White, 60.89% Black or African American, 0.04% Native American, and 0.77% from two or more races. 0.88% of the population were Hispanic or Latino of any race.

There were 1,026 households, of which 32.3% had children under the age of 18 living with them, 35.1% were married couples living together, 27.3% had a female householder with no husband present, and 32.9% were non-families. 31.2% of households were one person and 14.6% were one person aged 65 or older. The average household size was 2.56 and the average family size was 3.21.

The age distribution was 28.6% under the age of 18, 10.5% from 18 to 24, 20.9% from 25 to 44, 20.5% from 45 to 64, and 19.4% 65 or older. The median age was 37 years. For every 100 females, there were 86.8 males. For every 100 females age 18 and over, there were 74.6 males.

The median household income was $22,930 and the median family income  was $28,990. Males had a median income of $36,071 versus $23,224 for females. The per capita income for the city was $13,271. About 27.2% of families and 35.3% of the population were below the poverty line, including 47.1% of those under age 18 and 26.2% of those age 65 or over.

2010 census
As of the census of 2010, there were 2,497 people, 1,045 households, and 629 families living in the city. The racial makeup of the city was 66.5% Black or African American, 32.0% White,  0.2% Native American, and 0.6% from two or more races. 0.5% of the population were Hispanic or Latino of any race.

There were 1,045 households, of which 25.6% had children under the age of 18 living with them, 30.4% were married couples living together, 25.2% had a female householder with no husband present, and 39.8% were non-families. 37.0% of households were one person and 15.9% were one person aged 65 or older. The average household size was 2.31 and the average family size was 3.07.

The age distribution was 24.9% under the age of 18, 7.9% from 18 to 24, 20.5% from 25 to 44, 26.8% from 45 to 64, and 19.9% 65 or older. The median age was 42 years. For every 100 females, there were 81.1 males. For every 100 females age 18 and over, there were 88.3 males.

The median household income was $30,082 and the median family income  was $36,379. Males had a median income of $28,869 versus $22,528 for females. The per capita income for the city was $16,277. About 19.0% of families and 23.8% of the population were below the poverty line, including 34.9% of those under age 18 and 23.7% of those age 65 or over.

2020 census

As of the 2020 United States census, there were 2,218 people, 1,214 households, and 648 families residing in the city.

Government and infrastructure
The city of Greensboro has a mayor-council form of government. There is a full-time police force with approximately 13 officers. The city has a volunteer fire department.

Greensboro is served by one public K-12 public school, Greensboro Public School, with two campuses. There is one private K-12 school, Southern Academy.

Notable people 
Anthony Bryant, defensive tackle in the NFL
Scott Burton, sculptor and performance artist
Alfred Chapman, Los Angeles real estate attorney and investor, and one of the founders of Orange, California
John Gayle, seventh governor of the U.S. state of Alabama (1831–1835)
Amelia Gayle Gorgas, former librarian for the University of Alabama and mother of Surgeon General William C. Gorgas
Richmond Pearson Hobson (1870–1937), member of the United States House of Representatives and Medal of Honor recipient
Grady Jackson, professional football player
Pete Jarman (1892–1955), member of the United States House of Representatives and former United States Ambassador to Australia
Andrew Killgore (1919–2016), United States Foreign Service Officer and ambassador to Qatar
Thomas E. Knight, 13th Lieutenant Governor of Alabama and 19th Attorney General of Alabama 
Hedgemon Lewis, boxer, former world title contender
William Burns Paterson, teacher, founder of Tullibody Academy and Alabama State University
Israel Pickens, third governor of Alabama (1821–1825)
Eugene Sawyer, 53rd mayor of Chicago (1987-1989)
Thomas Seay, 27th governor of Alabama (1886–1890)
Armistead I. Selden, Jr. (1921–1985), member of the United States House of Representatives and former United States Ambassador to New Zealand, Fiji, the Kingdom of Tonga, and Western Samoa
Little Sonny, electric blues musician and songwriter
Barry Wagner, former wide receiver/linebacker in the Arena Football League
Bob Wiggins, outfielder in the Negro American League
Henry Williams, former NFL defensive back
Lamanzer Williams, former NFL defensive end
Cedric Harris, Educator, Innovator, Youth Mentor

References 

Populated places established in 1823
Cities in Alabama
Cities in Hale County, Alabama
County seats in Alabama
Tuscaloosa, Alabama metropolitan area
1823 establishments in Alabama